The 1988 Motorcraft Quality Parts 500 was a NASCAR Winston Cup Series racing event held on March 20, 1988, at Atlanta International Raceway in Hampton, Georgia.

A souvenir program was handed out at this racing event; each copy sold at $5 USD ($ when adjusted for inflation).

This was the last NASCAR race called for ABC by Keith Jackson. Paul Page began calling races at the 1988 Firecracker 400 until Bob Jenkins took over in the 1990s.

Background
Atlanta International Raceway (now Atlanta Motor Speedway) is one of ten current intermediate tracks to hold NASCAR races; the others are Charlotte Motor Speedway, Chicagoland Speedway, Darlington Raceway, Homestead Miami Speedway, Kansas Speedway, Kentucky Speedway, Las Vegas Motor Speedway, New Hampshire Motor Speedway, and Texas Motor Speedway. However, at the time, only Charlotte and Darlington were built.

The track's turns are banked at twenty-four degrees, while the front stretch, the location of the finish line, and the back stretch are banked at five.

Summary

Qualifying 

Eleven drivers failed to qualify for the race:
 Buddy Arrington (No. 67)
 Charlie Baker (No. 93)
 Mickey Gibbs (No. 01)
 Jimmy Horton (No. 80)
 Dale Jarrett (No. 1)
 Rick Jeffrey (No. 86)
 Jocko Maggiacomo (No. 63)
 Steve Moore (No. 22)
 Dave Pletcher (No. 03)
 Greg Sacks (No. 50) (accident in practice)
 Tony Spanos (No. 48) (accident in practice)
Two drivers were awarded provisional qualifying positions at the back of the grid. These were Davey Allison (41st), and Ken Bouchard (42nd). Dale Jarrett started in 40th position on the grid, in Connie Saylor's No. 99 car, thus Jarrett was awarded the driver points for the car's finish.

Race 
There were 42 cars on the starting grid for this 328-lap race. Approximately 12% of this event was held under caution. A long green flag stretch between laps 152 and 297 would be dominated by Dale Earnhardt, Benny Parsons and Rusty Wallace in addition to several other drivers. Parsons was the only driver who could hang with Earnhardt through the first half of the race. He got trapped a lap down after a crash during green flag pit stops. Dale Earnhardt would end up besting Rusty Wallace by 9 seconds after racing for more than three and a half hours. This would become his first points victory in the #3 black Chevrolet machine.

Bill Elliott and Rusty Wallace would win most of the races that year. By the time that Earnhardt achieved his final NASCAR Cup Series win at the 2000 Winston 500, he had already picked up 45 wins with the black Chevrolet that people still associate with him today. Former NASCAR crew chief and driver Kirk Shelmerdine would guide Earnhardt to the 32nd win of his NASCAR Cup Series career.

Jimmy Means finished in the last place position due to a problem with his engine on the third lap. All of the drivers in this event were born in the United States of America. Brad Noffsinger made his debut and finished in 14th place (after starting in a 25th place). Sixty-two thousand attended this event and would see Derrike Cope become the lowest-finishing driver to complete the event; despite being more than 100 laps behind the lead vehicles. Bill Elliott's crash on lap 312 would prevent him from a top ten finish. A. J. Foyt had a competitive run from his 6th-place qualification right up to lap 85; where his engine gave out and knocked him out of the race.

Ricky Rudd's Quaker State car blew a motor on lap 253.

Despite Bill Elliott's lackluster performance in this race, he would go on to defeat Rusty Wallace for the 1988 NASCAR Winston Cup championship by a mere 24 points. The only drivers to win a Ford vehicle were him, Dale Jarrett and Alan Kulwicki. Brad Noffsinger and Rodney Combs were refused NASCAR championship points for not submitting their entry forms to the NASCAR officials in a suitable amount of time. They did, however, qualify for their respective spots and were cleared to compete.

Individual monetary earnings from this event ranged from the winner's share of $69,750 ($ when adjusted for inflation) to the last-place share of $4,410 ($ when adjusted for inflation). The total prize purse for this race was $416,355 ($ when adjusted for inflation).

Finishing order
Section reference:

 Dale Earnhardt
 Rusty Wallace
 Darrell Waltrip
 Terry Labonte
 Kyle Petty
 Bobby Hillin Jr.
 Buddy Baker
 Ken Schrader
 Brett Bodine
 Rick Wilson
 Bobby Allison
 Michael Waltrip
 Benny Parsons
 Brad Noffsinger
 Dave Marcis
 Ken Bouchard
 Eddie Bierschwale
 Ernie Irvan
 Bill Elliott
 Sterling Marlin
 Harry Gant
 Neil Bonnett
 Richard Petty
 Ricky Rudd
 Jimmy Sauter
 Derrike Cope
 Rodney Combs
 David Sosebee
 Dale Jarrett
 Morgan Shepherd
 Mark Martin
 Cale Yarborough
 Geoffrey Bodine
 A. J. Foyt
 Ken Ragan
 Brad Teague
 Phil Parsons
 Lake Speed
 Alan Kulwicki
 Davey Allison
 H. B. Bailey
 Jimmy Means

Standings after the race

References

Motorcraft Quality Parts 500
Motorcraft Quality Parts 500
NASCAR races at Atlanta Motor Speedway